East Asian painting may refer to:

 Chinese painting
 Korean painting
 Japanese painting